Quartermaster sergeant instructor (QMSI) is a warrant officer appointment in the armies of the United Kingdom and Canada.

British Army
Quartermaster sergeant instructor is an appointment held by warrant officers class 2 in the British Army's Small Arms School Corps and by some in the Royal Engineers and Royal Army Physical Training Corps.

Canada
In the Canadian Army, QMSI is an appointment held by the senior master warrant officer within each battalion of the Princess Patricia's Canadian Light Infantry.

Military appointments of the British Army
Military appointments of Canada
Warrant officers